The Magritte Award for Best Actress (French: Magritte de la meilleure actrice) is an award presented annually by the Académie André Delvaux. It is given in honor of an actress who has delivered an outstanding performance in a leading role while working within the film industry. It is one of the Magritte Awards, which were established to recognize excellence in Belgian cinematic achievements.

The 1st Magritte Awards ceremony was held in 2011 with Anne Coesens receiving the award for her role in Illegal. As of the 2022 ceremony, Jo Deseure is the most recent winner in this category for her role in Madly in Life.

Winners and nominees
In the list below, winners are listed first in the colored row, followed by the other nominees.

2010s

2020s

References

External links
 Magritte Awards official website
 Magritte Award for Best Actress at AlloCiné

2011 establishments in Belgium
Awards established in 2011
Film awards for lead actress
Actress